Jang Song-hyok (born 18 January 1991) is a North Korean association footballer who currently plays for  Visakha in the Cambodian League and the North Korea national team. He plays as a centre back.

Career
Song-hyok represents Rimyongsu Sports Club in the DRP Korean league. He was selected to represent DPR Korea at the 2011 FIFA U-20 World Cup in Colombia. His first goal came against Tajikistan in the Third Round of World Cup qualifying. During the 2012 AFC Challenge Cup Song-hyok would score a penalty to give North Korea the win over Turkmenistan in the final.

International goals

References

External links

 Goal profile
Jang Song-hyok at Asian Games Incheon 2014

1991 births
Living people
Association football defenders
North Korea international footballers
North Korean footballers
Footballers at the 2014 Asian Games
2015 AFC Asian Cup players
Pyongyang Sports Club players
Rimyongsu Sports Club players
Asian Games medalists in football
Expatriate footballers in Cambodia
North Korean expatriate footballers
Asian Games silver medalists for North Korea
Medalists at the 2014 Asian Games
21st-century North Korean people